The San Cristobal shrew (Sorex stizodon) is a species of mammal in the family Soricidae. It is endemic to Mexico. It is known only from the Huitepec Ecological Reserve west of San Cristóbal de las Casas in the Chiapas Highlands of central Chiapas. It is found at  elevation in montane cloud forests.

References

Sorex
Endemic mammals of Mexico
Central American pine–oak forests
Chiapas Highlands
Taxonomy articles created by Polbot
Mammals described in 1895
Taxa named by Clinton Hart Merriam